Mohammad Hassan Ganji Ph.D, (June 11, 1912 – July 19, 2012) was an Iranian meteorologist and academic. He was born in Birjand. He is credited as being the father of modern geography in Iran.

Education
He completed his studies in Tehran and continued to study geography in England and the United States. He next began to teach at the University of Tehran and was the first who began to teach modern geography at universities. Ganji established the Iran Meteorological Organization in 1955 and ran the organization for several years. He is often acknowledged as the father of modern geography in Iran.

Career
Ganji established the Iran Meteorological Organization in 1955 and served as the head of Iran's Department General of Meteorology from 1956 to 1968.

Awards
Winner of the International Meteorological Organization (IMO) Prize 2001 Professor M. H. Ganji (Iran)

Works
He has written over 130 articles in Persian and English and has trained many scholars and masters of geography over the years.
 He is considered to be the father of modern geography in Iran. one of the work he had shared his knowledge was atlas and book Documents on the Persian Gulf's name.

See also
Birjand
Documents on the Persian Gulf's name
Persian gulf

References

External links
 Mohammad Hassan Ganji in IRNA persianپروفسور محمد حسن گنجي پدر علم جغرافيا
 Mohammad Hassan Ganji#پروفسور_گنجی Instagram posts (photos and videos) - Igshid.com
 Ganji
 

1912 births
2012 deaths
Alumni of the University of Manchester
Clark University alumni
Iranian centenarians
Iranian meteorologists
Men centenarians
People from Birjand
Academic staff of the University of Tehran
Recipients of the Order of Knowledge
Iranian Science and Culture Hall of Fame recipients in Geography